Norman Reginald Goodes (born 4 April 1991) is a former South African-born rugby union player who played as a prop for  in New Zealand's domestic Mitre 10 Cup from 2010 to 2016 and for the  in the international Super Rugby competition from 2012 to 2016.

He announced his retirement in early 2018 on medical advice after suffering a number of concussions.

Early career

Born in Witbank, South Africa, Goodes emigrated to New Zealand with his family in 2006. Having attended Afrikaans Hoër Seunskool in Pretoria, he completed his schooling at Wellington College where he played first XV rugby for 3 years. After graduating high school, he started playing for Poneke in Wellington's local club rugby competition.

Senior career

Serving primarily as back-up to the more experienced Jacob Ellison through 2011, Goodes did manage to earn more game time, appearing in 7 matches with 5 of these appearances from the start. He only played 5 times during 2012, but was much more of a regular in 2013, featuring in 11 of the Lions 12 matches during a year which saw them finish as runner-up to  following a 29-13 defeat in the ITM Cup Premiership final.

2014 was an absolute disaster of a year as far as the men from New Zealand's capital were concerned as they finished bottom of the Premiership log with just 1 win from 10 outings and were subsequently relegated to the Championship division for 2015. A head injury meant that Goodes could only play twice in 2014 and was left watching helplessly from the sidelines as his team-mates struggled on the field.

Wellington were unable to win promotion at the first time of asking, finishing 2nd behind  in the Championship standings before being defeated 26-25 by the same opposition in the playoff final. Goodes had fully recovered from the previous season's injury struggles and played 11 of the Lions 12 games, netting his first 2 provincial tries in the process.

Goodes once again had injuries to contend with and was only able to play 5 times during the campaign, but despite this, he managed to score an impressive 4 tries.

Super Rugby

At the age of 21 and with barely a season and a half of provincial experience under his belt, Goodes was named in the  squad for the 2012 Super Rugby season.

Goodes did not play any Super Rugby matches in 2017 due to an ongoing problem with concussions, and he retired in February 2018, aged 26, for the same reason.

International

Goodes was a New Zealand Schools representative in 2009.

On 5 November 2016, he featured for the Barbarians in their 31-31 draw against the land of his birth,  at Wembley Stadium.

Career Honours

Hurricanes

Super Rugby - 2016

Super Rugby Statistics

References

Living people
New Zealand rugby union players
Hurricanes (rugby union) players
Wellington rugby union players
People from Witbank
1991 births
Rugby union props
Rugby union hookers
South African emigrants to New Zealand
People educated at Wellington College (New Zealand)
Barbarian F.C. players
Rugby union players from Mpumalanga